
The Kangaroo Hoppet is a long distance cross-country skiing race in Australia. It is held in Falls Creek, Victoria. It debuted in 1979, and is part of Worldloppet since 1991. It is held annually on the fourth Saturday of August.

The Kangaroo Hoppet event consists of three races:
 The Kangaroo Hoppet is a 42 km race, and for the purposes of the Worldloppet counts as a main race.
 The Australian Birkebeiner is a 21 km race, and for the purposes of Worldloppet counts as a short race.
 The Joey Hoppet is a 7 km race, and does not count as either a main race or a short race.

History

The Kangaroo Hoppet has its origins in the Birkebeiner Nordic Ski Club's 21 km Australian Birkebeiner, first held in 1979 in Falls Creek. The race was based on the original Norwegian Birkebeiner. In 1989, the organisation extended the race to a 42 km race, and added the 21 km race and 7 km race (which would originally be known as the Birkebeiner Lite). They then petitioned the Worldloppet in 1990 to allow a race in the southern hemisphere, and as part of its petition the race format was changed to a freestyle event. The first race as part of the Worldloppet circuit was held in 1991.

Winners

Men
-

Women

References

External links
Kangaroo Hoppet web site

Cross-country skiing competitions
Skiing in Australia
August sporting events
1979 establishments in Australia
Recurring sporting events established in 1979
Sports competitions in Victoria (Australia)
Ski marathons